The 1992 Women's Silver Unicorn World Open Squash Championship was the women's edition of the 1992 World Open, which serves as the individual world championship for squash players. The event took place in Vancouver in Canada between 4 October and 10 October 1992. Susan Devoy won her fourth World Open title, defeating Michelle Martin in the final.

Seeds

Draw and results

Finals

Top half

Section 1

Section 2

Bottom half

Section 3

Section 4

Notes
Susan Devoy retired in 1992 after a career that saw four World Open successes and eight British Open titles.

See also
World Open
1992 Men's World Open Squash Championship

References

External links
Womens World Open

World Squash Championships
1992 in squash
Sport in Vancouver
1992 in Canadian sports
Squash tournaments in Canada
1992 in women's squash
International sports competitions hosted by Canada